Chromasette was the first cassette-based TRS-80 Color Computer magazine produced by David Lagerquist and was an offshoot of CLOAD magazine. The first issue was published July 1981 and the last issue was published in July 1984. Issues were published monthly. It was headquartered in Santa Barbara, California.

While some references cite the price as having been US$3.50 an issue, it was advertised in Creative Computing magazine in May 1983 as $45 a year for 12 issues, $25 for 6 issues, or $5 each. The first issue contained 5 Basic programs and the "cover" of the electronic magazine (which had to be loaded onto a TRS-80 Color Computer and then run) was dynamic. Included with each cassette was a 5-6 page newsletter explaining the programs included on the cassette, including their PMODE and PCLEAR values (if needed), their locations on tape, and several paragraphs of documentation about each (sometimes suggesting program alterations that change or improve the results). The newsletter contained tips, rumors (for example whether the TRS-80 Color Computer would soon support 5" floppy diskette drives in addition to cassettes for loading and recording software programs), along with other insights. They contained a variety of information about the Color Computer and some of the hardware and software available for it. In addition, they included advertisements. Dave signed only his first name to the CLOAD and Chromasette letters.

How cassettes were produced
(from comment from David Lagerquist in the April 1983 issue)

"How do we duplicate the 6000 or so cassettes we send out each month? Rose
just doesn't sleep! Really, the programs are read off a disk and sent
through a line amplifier to 30 cassette recorders hooked up in parallel.
The recorders are controlled by a Color Computer through the microphone
jack. The 'random' clicking of 30 buttons lets us know that the tapes are
done and that it's time to put in some more blank ones. A heck of a way to
make a living..."

Issues
The following is an incomplete listing of files included in Chromasette issues.

July 1981
COVER    BAS 0 B 3
HOWFAR   BAS 0 B 4
BLOCKADE BAS 0 B 3
ACUMEN   BAS 0 B 3
DISRTATN BAS 0 B 3
BLAST    BAS 0 B 3

August 1981
HORNCOV  BAS 0 B 2
DRAWINST BAS 0 B 3
DRAWER   BAS 0 B 3
WORDS    BAS 0 B 3
JERUSADV BAS 0 B 4
LANDER   BAS 0 B 3
TWODATES BAS 0 B 2

September 1981
NERVES   BAS 0 B 2
SPELLIT  BAS 0 B 3
BASEGUES BAS 0 B 3
HICALC   BAS 0 B 3
MUSICPAT BAS 0 B 2
SEEKCOVR BAS 0 B 3

October 1981
COVER124 BAS 0 B 2
MAGICSQR BAS 0 B 2
MCJUMP   BAS 0 B 3
COEFF    BAS 0 B 2
TOWERINS BAS 0 B 1
TOWER    BAS 0 B 2
PHONEWRD BAS 0 B 1

November 1981
TURKCOV  BAS 0 B 3
STAREATR BAS 0 B 2
UFOMATH  BAS 0 B 2
MORSINST BAS 0 B 1
MORSQUIZ BAS 0 B 4
REVERSI  BAS 0 B 2

December 1981
GRAPHCOV BAS 0 B 3
DOGSTARS BAS 0 B 2
BASECONV BAS 0 B 2
AMORT    BAS 0 B 2
POUNCE   BAS 0 B 1
ROTATE   BAS 0 B 1
FIGURE   DAT 1 A 3
WORLDMAP BAS 0 B 4

January 1982
LINESCOV BAS 0 B 2
BLOCK    BAS 0 B 2
TYPING   BAS 0 B 2
MANSION  BAS 0 B 4
POWER    BAS 0 B 3
WORLD3D  BAS 0 B 4

February 1982
MOIRECOV BAS 0 B 1
BLEEP    BAS 0 B 2
DUMPALL  BAS 0 B 3
ABM      BAS 0 B 3
DISASSEM BAS 0 B 3
SHRINK   BIN 2 B 1
CHECKREG BAS 0 B 4
SPIRAL   BAS 0 B 2
MINMUSIC BAS 0 B 1
AMAZING  BAS 0 B 2
ADDRESS  BAS 0 B 3
OLDHOUSE BAS 0 B 5
CKMON    BIN 2 B 1

March 1982
POLYCOV  BAS 0 B 2
RUBIC    BAS 0 B 5
BOBO     BAS 0 B 3
SPACE    BAS 0 B 2
FINANCE  BAS 0 B 3
LAZKEY   BIN 2 B 1
MANYBODY BAS 0 B 1
BLOTCH   BAS 0 B 2
RADAR    BAS 0 B 3
NOTEBOOK BAS 0 B 1
NOTEDESC BIN 2 B 5
ULTIMATE BAS 0 B 5
APPEND   BAS 0 B 2

April 1982
POLYCOV  BAS 0 B 2
RUBIC    BAS 0 B 5
BOBO     BAS 0 B 3
SPACE    BAS 0 B 2
FINANCE  BAS 0 B 3
LAZKEY   BIN 2 B 1
MANYBODY BAS 0 B 1

May 1982
BLOTCH   BAS 0 B 2
RADAR    BAS 0 B 3
HELLO    BAS 0 B 2
NOTEBOOK BAS 0 B 1
NOTEDESC BIN 2 B 5
ULTIMATE BAS 0 B 5
APPEND   BAS 0 B 2

June 1982
FIRECOV  BAS 0 B 2
MARTIAN  BAS 0 B 2
FINDIT   BAS 0 B 3
STRING   BAS 0 B 1
SCRAMBLE BAS 0 B 5
DISKEDIT BAS 0 B 4
SPACEACE BIN 2 B 2

July 1982
GEOCOV   BAS 0 B 3
STARMAP  BAS 0 B 3
TICKER   BAS 0 B 3
ROCKS    BAS 0 B 3
NOTES    BAS 0 B 3
MUSICK   BAS 0 B 1
MENU     BAS 0 B 2

August 1982
MUSICCOV BAS 0 B 3
CHICKEN  BAS 0 B 2
EQUATION BAS 0 B 2
NAUGAINS BAS 0 B 3 (Realm of Nauga instructions)
NAUGA   BAS 0 B 4 (Realm of Nauga)
MAXIMUM  BAS 0 B 4
DISDEMO  BAS 0 B 3
CLOCK    BAS 0 B 1

September 1982
BOXCOV   BAS 0 B 2
PICKEM   BAS 0 B 3
WILLADV  BAS 0 B 5
TYPETUTR BAS 0 B 4
TAPEINV  BAS 0 B 3
BASICMAP BAS 0 B 3
GERM     BIN 2 B 1

October 1982
CLASSCOV BAS 0 B 4
ASTROINS BAS 0 B 2
ASTROMIN BAS 0 B 3
ROLL     BAS 0 B 3
BEAMS    BAS 0 B 4
CATALOG  BAS 0 B 2
SAY&PLAY BAS 0 B 6
PONG     BIN 2 B 1

November 1982
TEXCOV   BAS 0 B 2
MORAINE  BAS 0 B 3
LIFE     BAS 0 B 3
DIGGEM   BAS 0 B 3
CRAZMAZE BAS 0 B 2
SMALTEXT BAS 0 B 3
GRAFTEXT BAS 0 B 4
PIANO    BIN 2 B 1

December 1982
XMASCOV  BAS 0 B 3
MRMUNCH  BAS 0 B 4
ROBOTRUN BAS 0 B 3
KALIEDOS BAS 0 B 2
CURVEINS BAS 0 B 4
CURVEFIT BAS 0 B 4
HISCORE  BAS 0 B 2
BOXSHOOT BIN 2 B 2

January 1983
PLANCOV - Planner Cover
LEAKYTAP - Leaky Tap
HOUSEADV - House Adventure
KEEPTEXT - Keep Text
INST1 - Instructions Part 1
INST2 - Instructions Part 2
ROWBOAT - Rowboat
LISTMOD - ListMod

February 1983
FLAGCOV - Flag Cover
STELLINS - Stellar Instructions
STELLEMP - Stellar Empire
SORTS - Sorts
BAR - Bar Chart
XY - XY Graph
DISKAID - Disk Aid (disk only)
FLYBY - Flyby

March 1983
BIRDCOV  BAS 0 B 3
MICROBE  BAS 0 B 3
UTOPIAN  BAS 0 B 4
TAX      BAS 0 B 6
PIE      BAS 0 B 3
LANGINS  BAS 0 B 2
LANGDRL  BAS 0 B 3
SPANISH  DAT 1 A 1
FLYBY    BIN 2 B 2

April 1983
TARTCOV  BAS 0 B 2
FOOL     BAS 0 B 1
RESCUINS BAS 0 B 2
RESCUE   BAS 0 B 4
FILES    BAS 0 B 4
ASTBLAST BAS 0 B 3
PENIPEDE BIN 2 B 2
VARMAP   BAS 0 B 3

May 1983
DESCOVER BAS 0 B 2
BALLOONS BAS 0 B 3
ANDREA   BAS 0 B 5
KEEPADDR BAS 0 B 3
MAZE     BAS 0 B 2
GREMLML  BIN 2 B 2
GREMLIN  BAS 0 B 2
DELETER  BIN 2 B 1

June 1983
GUTSCOV  BAS 0 B 3
BOUNBABY BAS 0 B 2
MATHINS  BAS 0 B 3
MATHVADE BAS 0 B 3
KEEPLIST BAS 0 B 3
ZAPEM    BAS 0 B 4
REVERSE  BAS 0 B 1
FILECOPY BAS 0 B 1

July 1983
COLORCOV BAS 0 B 3
COVERUP  BAS 0 B 2
FLIGHT   BAS 0 B 2
HALL     BAS 0 B 3
PRECOMP  BAS 0 B 2
ADDRESS  PRE 0 A 3
ADDCASS  BAS 0 B 2
ZEROG    BIN 2 B 2
LISTER   BIN 2 B 1

August 1983
DOTCOVER BAS 0 B 2
MOONFLT  BAS 0 B 2
CASTLADV BAS 0 B 6
COLORINS BAS 0 B 2
COLORDOT BAS 0 B 3
KEEPCHEK BAS 0 B 3
TRKLOC   BAS 0 B 2
GRID     BIN 2 B 2
MLSCORE  BIN 2 B 1

September 1983
XFORMCOV BAS 0 B 3
TRAILS   BAS 0 B 3
FACTORS  BAS 0 B 4
BLAKINS  BAS 0 B 4
BLAKJAK  BAS 0 B 4
KEEPBUDG BAS 0 B 3
DIRSAVE  BAS 0 B 2
ANALYZE  BIN 2 B 1

October 1983
MARTNCOV BAS 0 B 3
QUICK    BAS 0 B 2
CHICK    BAS 0 B 3
TUTOCAT  BAS 0 B 4
CARDCAT  BAS 0 B 4
ISLEADV  BAS 0 B 5
OFFSET   BAS 0 B 2
NEWTRACE BIN 2 B 1

November 1983
FIGURCOV BAS 0 B 3
TIMEFLT  BAS 0 B 3
ASSMBLER BAS 0 B 5
ASMTEST  DAT 2 B 1
RADRUN   BAS 0 B 2
MASTRCAT BAS 0 B 4
TRSMEM   BAS 0 B 1
ANIHLTR  BIN 2 B 3

December 1983
FROSTCOV BAS 0 B 4
FLIP     BAS 0 B 3
QBEE     BAS 0 B 4
DSKTODSK BAS 0 B 2
CLUES    BAS 0 B 2
BOUNCER  BIN 2 B 2
FOREST   BIN 2 B 3

January 1984
OPARTCOV BAS 0 B 3
TAX83    BAS 0 B 5
STAYLIV  BAS 0 B 2
STARMUSS BAS 0 B 5
FORTRAN  BAS 0 B 4
FORDEMO  FOR 1 A 1
HELP     DAT 1 A 2
CLIMB    BIN 2 B 3

February 1984
SCALECOV BAS 0 B 2
CANNON   BAS 0 B 3
AUTODOC  BAS 0 B 2
STRKINS  BAS 0 B 4
COCOSTRK BAS 0 B 4
BLAZER   BAS 0 B 3
WIGWORM  BIN 2 B 2

March 1984
SHUTCOV  BAS 0 B 3
MATCH4   BAS 0 B 4
COUNT    BAS 0 B 4
PILOT    BAS 0 B 3
\*SAMPLE  DAT 1 A 1
SAMPLE   BAS 1 A 1
TAIPAN   BAS 0 B 6
COLRDUMP BAS 0 B 2
EZSKI    BIN 2 B 2

April 1984
CLOCKCOV BAS 0 B 3
PUZZROLL BAS 0 B 5
BUDGET   BAS 0 B 3
LUNARADV BAS 0 B 6
DRIVER   BIN 2 B 1
ABLE     BIN 2 B 2
MAZELAND BIN 2 B 2

References

External links
Chromasette (Physical collection) at the Highland Historic Computer Museum

Monthly magazines published in the United States
Cassette magazines
Defunct computer magazines published in the United States
Magazines established in 1981
Magazines disestablished in 1984
Magazines published in California